Paris Is Burning is a 1990 documentary film directed by Jennie Livingston. Filmed in the mid-to-late 1980s, it chronicles the ball culture of New York City and the African-American, Latino, gay, and transgender communities involved in it.
 
Critics consider the film to be an invaluable documentary of the end of the "Golden Age" of New York City drag balls, and a thoughtful exploration of race, class, gender, and sexuality in America.

In 2016, the film was selected for preservation in the United States National Film Registry by the Library of Congress as being "culturally, historically, or aesthetically significant".

The title takes its name from the Paris Is Burning ball held annually by artist Paris Dupree who appears in the film.

Content
The film explores the elaborately-structured ball competitions in which contestants, adhering to a very specific "category" or theme, must "walk", much like a fashion model parades a runway. Contestants are judged on criteria including their dance talent, the beauty of their clothing, and the "realness" of their drag - i.e., their ability to pass as a member of the group or sex they are portraying. For example, the category "banjee realness" comprises gay men portraying macho archetypes such as sailors, soldiers, and street hoodlums. "Banjee boys" are judged by their ability to pass as their straight counterparts in the outside world.

Most of the film alternates between footage of balls and interviews with prominent members of the scene, including Pepper LaBeija, Dorian Corey, Angie Xtravaganza, and Willi Ninja. Many of the contestants vying for trophies are representatives of "houses" that serve as intentional families, social groups, and performance teams. Houses and ball contestants who consistently win trophies for their walks eventually earn "legendary" status.

Jennie Livingston, who moved to New York after graduating from Yale to work in film, spent six years making Paris Is Burning, and interviewed key figures in the ball world. Many of them contribute monologues that shed light on gender roles, gay and ball subcultures, and their own life stories. The film explains how words such as house, mother, shade, reading and legendary gain new meaning when used in novel ways to describe the gay and drag subculture. The "houses" serve as surrogate families for young ball-walkers who face rejection from their biological families for their gender expression and sexual orientation.

The film also explores how its subjects deal with issues such as AIDS, racism, poverty, violence and homophobia. Some, such as Venus Xtravaganza, become sex workers to support themselves. Near the end of the film, Angie Xtravaganza, Venus's "house mother", reacts to news that Venus is found strangled to death and speculates that a disgruntled client killed her. Others shoplift clothing so they can "walk" in the balls. Several are disowned by transphobic and homophobic parents, leaving them vulnerable to homelessness. Some subjects save money for sex reassignment surgery, while a few have extensive surgery; others receive breast implants without undergoing vaginoplasty.

According to Livingston, the documentary is a multi-leveled exploration of an African-American and Latino subculture that serves as a microcosm of fame, race, and wealth in the larger US culture. Through candid one-on-one interviews, the film offers insight into the lives and struggles of its subjects and the strength, pride, and humor they display to survive in a "rich, white world."

Drag is presented as a complex performance of gender, class, and race, and a way to express one's identity, desires and aspirations. The African-American and Latino community depicted in the film includes a diverse range of sexual identities and gender presentations, from "butch queens" (gay cisgender men) to transgender women, to drag queens, to butch women.

The film also documents the origins of "voguing", a dance style in which competing ball-walkers pose and freeze in glamorous positions as if being photographed for the cover of Vogue. 
However, Livingston maintained in 1991 that the film was not just about dance: This is a film that is important for anyone to see, whether they're gay or not. It's about how we're all influenced by the media; how we strive to meet the demands of the media by trying to look like Vogue models or by owning a big car. And it's about survival. It's about people who have a lot of prejudices against them and who have learned to survive with wit, dignity and energy.

Scenes
Ball
Legendary
Categories
Lucious Body
Schoolboy/Schoolgirl realness
Town and country
Executive realness
Butch queen first time in drags at a ball
High fashion eveningwear
Realness
House
Mother
Shade
Reading
Voguing
Mopping

Conception and production
Livingston studied photography and painting at Yale University. After moving to New York, she worked for the Staten Island Advance, a local newspaper. She left for one summer to study film at New York University in Greenwich Village. She was photographing in that neighborhood's Washington Square Park, where she met two young men and was intrigued by their dancing and the unusual slang they were using. She asked what they were doing, and they told her that they were voguing. She attended her first ball, a mini-ball at the Gay Community Center on 13th Street, which she filmed as an assignment for her class at NYU.

At that mini-ball, Livingston encountered Venus Xtravaganza for the first time. Later, she spent time with Willi Ninja to learn about ball culture and voguing. She also researched African-American history, literature, and culture, and she also studied queer culture and the nature of subcultures. She conducted audio interviews with several ball participants: Venus and Danni Xtravaganza, Dorian Corey, Junior Labeija, Octavia St. Laurent and others. The main self-funded shoot was the Paris is Burning ball in 1986.

From that footage, Livingston worked with editor Jonathan Oppenheim to edit a trailer, which was then used to obtain funding from some grants, including awards from the National Endowment for the Arts, the New York State Council on the Arts, the Paul Robeson Fund, and the Jerome Foundation. Finally, Madison Davis Lacy, the head of public TV station WNYC, saw the material and contributed $125,000 to the production. The producers still needed to raise additional funds to edit the film, which came primarily from executive producer Nigel Finch at the BBC-2 show Arena.

There was some follow-up production in 1989: to tell the story of voguing's entry into mainstream culture, and to tell the stories of Willi's international success as a dancer and of Venus Xtravaganza's murder, which remains unsolved to this day. The filmmakers also did an additional interview with Dorian Corey, talking about "executive realness", "shade", and "reading".

The documentary took seven years to complete due to production costs and difficulties in obtaining funding. Livingston edited the final cut down to 78 minutes from over 75 hours of footage, all shot on expensive 16mm film. After the film's completion, the producers still needed to raise funds to get permission to use the music played in the ballrooms. It cost almost as much to clear the music as it did to shoot and edit the entire film. The production team had to rely on 10 separate funding sources throughout the course of the project.

Reception and legacy
The film received overwhelmingly positive reviews from a number of mainstream and independent presses, remarkable at that time for a film on the LGBT community, given the enormous legal and cultural obstacles that they faced then. The film holds a score of 98% on Rotten Tomatoes based on 54 reviews, with an average rating of 7.83/10. The website's critical consensus reads, "Paris Is Burning dives into the '80s transgender subculture, with the understated camera allowing this world to flourish and the people to speak (and dance) for themselves."

Terrence Rafferty of The New Yorker said the film was "a beautiful piece of work—lively, intelligent, exploratory …. Everything about Paris Is Burning signifies so blatantly and so promiscuously that our formulations – our neatly paired theses and antitheses – multiply faster than we can keep track of them. What's wonderful about the picture is that Livingston is smart enough not to reduce her subjects to the sum of their possible meanings..."

Filmmaker Michelle Parkerson, writing for The Black Film Review, called the film "a politically astute, historically important document of our precarious times.”

Essex Hemphill, the poet well known for his role in Marlon Riggs’s classic film Tongues Untied, reviewed the film for The Guardian, celebrating how the documentary created a forum for the people in it to speak in their own voices, and writing: “Houses of silk and gabardine are built. Houses of dream and fantasy. Houses that bear the names of their legendary founders…Houses rise and fall. Legends come and go. To pose is to reach for power while simultaneously holding real powerlessness at bay."

Yet the film was not without detractors even after its initial release.

Writing for Z Magazine, feminist writer bell hooks criticized the film for depicting the ritual of the balls as a spectacle to "pleasure" white spectators. Other authors such as Judith Butler and Phillip Harper have focused on the drag queens' desire to perform and present "realness". Realness can be described as the ability to appropriate an authentic gender expression. When performing under certain categories at the ball, such as school girl or executive, the queens are rewarded for appearing as close to the "real thing" as possible. A main goal amongst the contestants is to perform conventional gender roles while at the same time trying to challenge them.

Hooks also questions the political efficacy of the drag balls themselves, citing her own experiments with drag, and suggesting that the balls themselves lack political, artistic, and social significance. Hooks criticizes the production and questions gay men performing drag, suggesting that it is inherently misogynistic and degrading towards women. Butler responds to hooks' previous opinion that drag is misogynistic, stating in her book, Bodies that Matter: On the Discursive Limits of "Sex":
The problem with the analysis of drag as only misogyny is, of course, that it figures male-to-female transsexuality, cross-dressing, and drag as male homosexual activities — which they are not always — and it further diagnoses male homosexuality as rooted in misogyny.

Both hooks and Harper criticize the filmmaker, Jennie Livingston, who is Jewish, gender-nonconforming, and queer, for remaining visibly absent from the film. Although the viewers are able to hear Livingston a few times during the production, the director's physical absence while orchestrating the viewer's perspective, creates what hooks calls an "Imperial Oversee(r)".

In the years following the film's release, people have continued to speak and write about Paris Is Burning. In 2003, the New York Times reported that more than a decade after its release, Paris Is Burning remains a commonly cited and frequently used organizing tool for LGBT youth; a way for scholars and students to examine issues of race, class, and gender; a way for younger ball participants to meet their cultural ancestors; and a portrait of several remarkable Americans, almost all of whom have died since the film's production.

In 2013, UC Irvine scholar Lucas Hilderbrand wrote a history of the film, a book detailing its production, reception, and influence, Paris Is Burning, A Queer Film Classic (Arsenal Pulp Press). In 2007, writer Wesley Morris, in a print-only section for children for The New York Times, wrote "12 Films to See Before You Turn 13". The piece recommended kids see films like Princess Mononoke, The Wiz, and Do the Right Thing. About Paris Is Burning, Morris says "seeing [Livingston's] documentary as soon as possible means you can spend the rest of your life having its sense of humanity amuse, surprise, and devastate you, over and over."

Awards
 1990 – IDA Award, International Documentary Association
 1990 – LAFCA Award Best Documentary, Los Angeles Film Critics Association
 1990 – Audience Award Best Documentary, San Francisco International Lesbian & Gay Film Festival
 1991 – Grand Jury Prize Documentary, Sundance Film Festival
 1991 – Teddy Award for Best Documentary Film, Berlin International Film Festival
 1991 – Boston Society of Film Critics Awards (BSFC) Best Documentary
 1991 – Open Palm Award, Gotham Awards
 1991 – NYFCC Award Best Documentary, New York Film Critics Circle Awards
 1991 – Golden Space Needle Award Best Documentary, Seattle International Film Festival
 1992 – Outstanding Film (Documentary), GLAAD Media Awards
 1992 – NSFC Award Best Documentary, National Society of Film Critics
 2015 – Cinema Eye Honours Legacy Award
 2016 – Added to the National Film Registry

Controversy
The film received funding from the National Endowment for the Arts during the period when the organization was under fire for funding controversial artists including Robert Mapplethorpe and Andres Serrano. Aware that publicity surrounding her project could result in revoked funding, Livingston avoided releasing many details about the project outside of her small circle of producers and collaborators.

Although there had been no agreement to do so, the producers planned to distribute approximately $55,000 (1/5 of the sale price of the film to Miramax) among 13 of the participants. While Dorian Corey and Willi Ninja were very happy to be paid for a film they'd understood was an unpaid work of nonfiction, several other film participants felt they were not properly compensated and thus retained an attorney, planning to sue for a share of the film's profits in 1991. When their attorney saw they had all signed standard model releases generated by WNYC Television, they did not sue and accepted payment. Paris Dupree had planned to sue for $40 million.

Livingston has consistently downplayed the financial controversy in interviews and forums. She has expressed that documentaries are works of nonfiction and journalism, and that it has never been standard practice to pay their subjects. She states that she paid the principals as a matter of respect at a time when this was not commonly done, and she argues that they received considerably more than they would have received if they had been actors in an independently-made drama feature.

Upon its release, the documentary received exceptionally good reviews from critics and won several awards including a Sundance Film Festival Grand Jury Prize, a Berlin International Film Festival Teddy Bear, an audience award from the Toronto International Film Festival, a GLAAD Media Award, a Women in Film Crystal Award, a Best Documentary award from the Los Angeles, New York, and National Film Critics' Circles, and it also was named as one of 1991's best films by the Los Angeles Times, The Washington Post, National Public Radio, Time magazine, and others.

In spite of the many positive reactions and film awards earned, Paris Is Burning did not receive an Academy Award nomination for Best Documentary Feature that year. This generated accusations that the Academy of Motion Picture Arts and Sciences was homophobic and transphobic (even though it awarded such LGBT films as Common Threads: Stories from the Quilt two years prior and The Times of Harvey Milk), which in turn led to changes on how documentaries are nominated for the Academy Awards.

See also
 The Queen (1968 film)
 Kiki (2016 film)

Notes

References

External links

 
 
 Paris Is Burning on Youtube
 From the New Yorker magazine film file
 Paris Is Burning: The Fire This Time an essay by Michelle Parkerson at the Criterion Collection

1990 films
1990 documentary films
1990 LGBT-related films
LGBT-related coming-of-age films
American independent films
American documentary films
LGBT African-American culture
American LGBT-related films
Documentary films about ball culture
Films about fashion
Documentary films about race and ethnicity in the United States
Documentary films about New York City
Films shot in New York City
Sundance Film Festival award winners
Transgender-related documentary films
Historiography of LGBT in New York City
African-American LGBT-related films
African-American films
United States National Film Registry films
Films about trans women
1990 independent films
Drag (clothing)-related films
Documentary films about dance
Films set in the 1980s
1990s English-language films
1990s American films